This is a list of 19th-century baseball players who have a biographic article.



A

John Abadie
Ed Abbaticchio
Bert Abbey
Charlie Abbey
Dan Abbott
Frank Abercrombie
Doc Adams
George Adams
Jim Adams
Bob Addy
Bill Ahearn
John Ake
Gus Alberts
Nin Alexander
Bob Allen
Ham Allen
Hezekiah Allen
Jack Allen
Myron Allen
Pete Allen
Andy Allison
Art Allison
Bill Allison
Doug Allison
Nick Altrock
Billy Alvord
Doc Amole
Bill Anderson
Dave Anderson
John Anderson
Varney Anderson
Ed Andrews
Jim Andrews
Wally Andrews
Fred Andrus
Wiman Andrus
Bill Annis
Cap Anson
Joe Ardner
Robert Armstrong
Billy Arnold
Harry Arundel
Tug Arundel
Charlie Atherton
Al Atkinson
Ed Atkinson
Harry Atkinson
Henry Austin
Jake Aydelott

B

Ed Bagley
Gene Bagley
Frank Bahret
Harvey Bailey
King Bailey
Charlie Baker
George Baker
Kirtley Baker
Norm Baker
Phil Baker
Jersey Bakley
Kid Baldwin
Lady Baldwin
Mark Baldwin
Art Ball
Studs Bancker
Jim Banning
Jimmy Bannon
Tom Bannon
Charlie Barber
Al Barker
Sam Barkley
Tom Barlow
Bill Barnes
Ross Barnes
Billy Barnie
Bob Barr
Bill Barrett
Jimmy Barrett
John Barrett
Marty Barrett
Frank Barrows
Shad Barry
Charlie Bartson
John Bass
Charley Bassett
Charlie Bastian
Frank Bates
John Bates
Larry Battam
Joe Battin
Al Bauer
George Bausewine
Burley Bayer
Jack Beach
Dave Beadle
Tommy Beals
Alex Beam
Ernie Beam
Ollie Beard
Ed Beatin
Ginger Beaumont
Edward Beavens
Buck Becannon
George Bechtel
Erve Beck
Frank Beck
Bob Becker
Jake Beckley
Ed Beecher
Steve Behel
Ira Belden
Charlie Bell
Frank Bell
Steve Bellán
Jack Bellman
Art Benedict
Ike Benners
Charlie Bennett
Cy Bentley
Marty Bergen
Tun Berger
John Bergh
Frank Berkelbach
Nate Berkenstock
Curt Bernard
Bill Bernhard
Charlie Berry
Tom Berry
Harry Berthrong
William Bestick
Dan Bickham
Ed Biecher
Oscar Bielaski
Lou Bierbauer
Charles Bierman
George Bignell
Jud Birchall
Frank Bird
George Bird
Dave Birdsall
Bill Bishop
Frank Bishop
Red Bittmann
Bob Black
George Blackburn
Bill Blair
Dick Blaisdell
Harry Blake
Bob Blakiston
Fred Blank
Harvey Blauvelt
Ned Bligh
Frank Bliss
Wes Blogg
Joe Blong
Steve Bloomer
Frederick Boardman
Charlie Bohn
Boland
Tommy Bond
Frank Bonner
George Boone
Booth
Amos Booth
Eddie Booth
George Borchers
Joe Borden
Andy Boswell
Cy Bowen
Frank Bowerman
Frank Bowes
Bill Bowman
Sumner Bowman
Bill Boyd
Frank Boyd
Jake Boyd
Eddie Boyle
Henry Boyle
Jack Boyle
Henry Boyle
Al Bradley
Bill Bradley
Foghorn Bradley
George Bradley
Spike Brady
Steve Brady
Asa Brainard
Mike Brannock
Kitty Bransfield
Kitty Brashear
Alonzo Breitenstein
Ted Breitenstein
Jack Brennan
Roger Bresnahan
Buttons Briggs
Charlie Briggs
Grant Briggs
Frank Brill
Fatty Briody
George Bristow
Jim Britt
Steve Brodie
Cal Broughton
Dan Brouthers
Charlie Brown
Ed Brown
Jim Brown
Joe Brown
John Brown
Lew Brown
Oliver Brown
Robert Brown
Stub Brown
Tom Brown
William Brown
Pete Browning
George Bryant
Tod Brynan
Fred Buckingham
Dick Buckley
John Buckley
Jay Budd
Fritz Buelow
Charlie Buffinton
Henry Buker
Sim Bullas
Josh Bunce
Ernie Burch
Bill Burdick
Jack Burdock
Dan Burke
Eddie Burke
James Burke
Jimmy Burke
Joe Burke
Mike Burke
William Burke
Jesse Burkett
Hercules Burnett
Dick Burns
Jim Burns
John Burns
Oyster Burns
Tom Burns
Buster Burrell
Harry Burrell
Al Burris
Henry Burroughs
Frank Burt
Doc Bushong
Bill Butler
Dick Butler
Frank Butler
Kid Butler
Frank Buttery

C

Charlie Cady
John Cahill
Tom Cahill
Will Calihan
Ed Callahan
John Callahan
Nixey Callahan
Kid Camp
Lew Camp
Count Campau
Hugh Campbell
Mike Campbell
Sam Campbell
Sal Campfield
Jim Canavan
Bart Cantz
John Carbine
Roger Carey
Scoops Carey
Tom Carey
Ed Carfrey
Bobby Cargo
Fred Carl
John Carl
Jim Carleton
George Carman
Jack Carney
Hick Carpenter
Charlie Carr
Bill Carrick
Chick Carroll
Cliff Carroll
Fred Carroll
Pat Carroll
Scrappy Carroll
Kid Carsey
Ed Cartwright
Bob Caruthers
Bob Casey
Dan Casey
Dennis Casey
Doc Casey
Tommy Casey
Ed Cassian
Ed Caskin
John Cassidy
Pete Cassidy
John Cattanach
James Cavanagh
Ice Box Chamberlain
Rome Chambers
Frank Chance
Frank Chapman
Jack Chapman
Jim Chatterton
Jack Chesbro
Bill Childress
Cupid Childs
Sam Childs
Pearce Chiles
Hi Church
Bobby Clack
Aaron Clapp
John Clapp
Denny Clare
Bob Clark
Ed Clark
Spider Clark
Willie Clark
Win Clark
Artie Clarke
Boileryard Clarke
Dad Clarke
Harry Clarke
Henry Clarke
Josh Clarke
Fred Clarke
Dad Clarkson
John Clarkson
Fritz Clausen
Fred Clement
Jack Clements
Elmer Cleveland
Monk Cline
Billy Clingman
Jim Clinton
Bill Clymer
George Cobb
Dick Cogan
Ed Cogswell
Tom Colcolough
John Coleman - OF/P
John Coleman - 1890 P
Percy Coleman
Walter Coleman
Billy Colgan
Harry Colliflower
Bill Collins
Chub Collins
Dan Collins
Hub Collins
Jimmy Collins
Bill Collver
Charles Comiskey
Fred Cone
Ed Conley
Bert Conn
Frank Connaughton
Peter Connell
Terry Connell
Red Connally
Jim Connor
Joe Connor
John Connor
Ned Connor
Roger Connor
Jerry Connors
Joe Connors
Theodore Conover
Ben Conroy
Bill Conway
Dick Conway
Jim Conway
Pete Conway
Dan Coogan
Paul Cook
Fred Cooke
Duff Cooley
William Coon
Jimmy Cooney
Joe Corbett
Jack Corcoran
John Corcoran
Larry Corcoran
Mike Corcoran
Tommy Corcoran
Fred Corey
Phil Coridan
Pop Corkhill
Henry Cote
Dan Cotter
Tom Cotter
Bill Coughlin
Dennis Coughlin
Ed Coughlin
Roscoe Coughlin
Bill Coyle
Frank Cox
Dick Cramer
Ed Crane
Fred Crane
Sam Crane
Bill Craver
George Crawford
Sam Crawford
George Creamer
Mark Creegan
Gus Creely
Pete Cregan
Jim Creighton
Morrie Critchley
Art Croft
Harry Croft
Dan Cronin
Jack Cronin
Jack Crooks
George Crosby
Amos Cross
Clarence Cross
Joe Cross
Lave Cross
Lem Cross
Monte Cross
Doug Crothers
Joe Crotty
Billy Crowell
Bill Crowley
John Crowley
Jim Cudworth
John Cuff
John Cullen
Candy Cummings
Bert Cunningham
George Cuppy
Doc Curley
John Curran
Wes Curry
Jim Curtiss
Ed Cushman
Ned Cuthbert

D

Bill Dahlen
John Dailey
Con Daily
Ed Daily
Hugh Daily
Vince Dailey
George Daisy
Bill Daley
Abner Dalrymple
Joe Daly
Tom Daly
Bill Dammann
Charlie Daniels
Law Daniels
Pete Daniels
George Darby
Dell Darling
Jack Darragh
Dan Daub
George Davies
Daisy Davis
George Davis
Harry Davis
Ira Davis
Jumbo Davis
Wiley Davis
Bill Day
Ren Deagle
Pat Dealy
John Deasley
Dory Dean
Harry Deane
Pat Deasley
Frank Decker
George Decker
Harry Decker
Jim Dee
Herman Dehlman
Ed Delahanty
Tom Delahanty
Bill Delaney
Fred Demarais
Harry DeMiller
Gene DeMontreville
Jerry Denny
Roger Denzer
Gene Derby
George Derby
Jim Devlin (1870s P)
Jim Devlin (1880s P)
Thomas Devyr
Charlie Dewald
Charlie Dexter
Buttercup Dickerson
Steve Dignan
Pat Dillard
John Dillon
Packy Dillon
Pop Dillon
Bill Dinneen
Frank Diven
Fred Doe
Ed Doheny
Cozy Dolan
Joe Dolan
John Dolan
Tom Dolan
Lester Dole
Jiggs Donahue
Jim Donahue
Red Donahue
Tim Donahue
Frank Donnelly
James Donnelly
Jim Donnelly
Pete Donnelly
Alexander Donoghue
Bill Donovan
Fred Donovan
Patsy Donovan
John Doran
Jerry Dorgan
Mike Dorgan
Bert Dorr
Joseph Dorsey
Herm Doscher
Babe Doty
Charlie Dougherty
Klondike Douglass
Clarence Dow
Tommy Dowd
Joe Dowie
Pete Dowling
Tom Dowse
Conny Doyle
Jack Doyle
Jacob Doyle
John Doyle
Lyman Drake
Dave Drew
Dennis Driscoll
Denny Driscoll
Mike Drissel
Charlie Duffee
Ed Duffy
Hugh Duffy
Bill Dugan
Ed Dugan
Dan Dugdale
Bill Duggleby
Martin Duke
Jim Duncan
Ed Dundon
Sam Dungan
Davey Dunkle
Fred Dunlap
Jack Dunn
Steve Dunn
Andy Dunning
Jesse Duryea
Bill Duzen
Al Dwight
Frank Dwyer
John Dwyer
John Dyler

E

Bill Eagan
Bill Eagle
Howard Earl
Billy Earle
Mal Eason
Harry East
Henry Easterday
Jack Easton
Hi Ebright
Charlie Eden
Edwards
Jim Egan
Rip Egan
Dave Eggler
Red Ehret
Ed Eiteljorge
Eland
Kid Elberfeld
Joe Ellick
Ben Ellis
Bones Ely
Harry Ely
Charlie Emig
Bob Emslie
Duke Esper
Dude Esterbrook
Frank Eustace
Evans
Jake Evans
Roy Evans
Bill Everitt
Tom Evers
George Ewell
Buck Ewing
John Ewing

F

Jay Faatz
Bill Fagan
Joe Fagin
George Fair
Anton Falch
Jack Fanning
Lawrence Farley
Bill Farmer
Sid Farrar
Bill Farrell
Duke Farrell
Jack Farrell - Second Baseman
Jack Farrell - Outfielder
Joe Farrell
John Farrow
Frederick Fass
C. K. Fauver
Jack Fee
Frank Fennelly
Bob Ferguson
Charlie Ferguson
Alex Ferson
Jim Field
Sam Field
George Fields
Jocko Fields
Jack Fifield
Frank Figgemeier
Bill Finley
John Firth
John Fischer
Leo Fishel
Charlie Fisher
Charlie Fisher
Chauncey Fisher
Cherokee Fisher
George Fisher
Ike Fisher
Wes Fisler
Dennis Fitzgerald
John Fitzgerald (Rochester Broncos pitcher)
John Fitzgerald (Boston Reds pitcher)
Warren Fitzgerald
Martin Flaherty
Pat Flaherty
Patsy Flaherty
Ed Flanagan
Frank Fleet
Tom Fleming
George Fletcher
Elmer Flick
Silver Flint
Tim Flood
Dickie Flowers
Carney Flynn
Clipper Flynn
Ed Flynn
George Flynn
Jocko Flynn
Joe Flynn
Mike Flynn
Jim Fogarty
John Fogarty
Curry Foley
John Foley
Tom Foley
Will Foley
Jim Foran
Davy Force
Ed Ford
Tom Ford
Brownie Foreman
Frank Foreman
Tom Forster
Elmer Foster
Pop Foster
Reddy Foster
Robert Foster
Henry Fournier
Bill Fouser
Dave Foutz
Bud Fowler
Bill Fox
George Fox
John Fox
Ossie France
Charlie Frank
Fred Frank
Franklin
Chick Fraser
Buck Freeman
Julie Freeman
Bill French
Frank Freund
Pat Friel
Danny Friend
Pete Fries
Charlie Frisbee
Emil Frisk
Ed Fuller
Harry Fuller
Shorty Fuller
Chick Fulmer
Chris Fulmer
Washington Fulmer
Dave Fultz
Eddie Fusselback

G

Bill Gallagher
William Gallagher
John Galligan
Pete Galligan
John Galvin
Lou Galvin
Pud Galvin
Bob Gamble
Gussie Gannon
Charlie Ganzel
John Ganzel
Alex Gardner
Bill Gardner
Gid Gardner
Jim Gardner
Bill Garfield
Willie Garoni
Jim Garry
Ned Garvin
Ed Gastfield
Hank Gastright
Frank Gatins
Mike Gaule
Gavern
Dale Gear
Count Gedney
Billy Geer
Charlie Geggus
Phil Geier
Bill Geiss
Emil Geiss
Frank Genins
Bill George
Joe Gerhardt
Les German
Charlie Gettig
Tom Gettinger
Charlie Getzien
Charlie Gessner
Jake Gettman
Robert Gibson
Whitey Gibson
Bill Gilbert
Harry H. Gilbert
Jack Gilbert
John Gilbert
Pete Gilbert
Hugh Gilgan
Bob Gilks
Jim Gill
Sam Gillen
Tom Gillen
Jim Gillespie
Patrick Gillespie
Barney Gilligan
George Gillpatrick
Jim Gilman
Pit Gilman
Jim Gilmore
Henry Gilroy
John Gilroy
Billy Ging
Buck Gladmon
Jack Glasscock
Bill Gleason (P)
Bill Gleason (SS)
Jack Gleason
Bob Glenalvin
Ed Glenn - OF
Ed Glenn - SS
John Glenn
Jot Goar
John Godar
Billy Goeckel
George Goetz
Mike Golden
Walt Goldsby
Fred Goldsmith
Wally Goldsmith
Herb Goodall
Bill Goodenough
Mike Goodfellow
Jake Goodman
George Gore
Jack Gorman
Joe Gormley
Charlie Gould
John Grady
Mike Grady
Louis Graff
John Graff
Bernie Graham
Lew Graulich
Frank Graves
Charlie Gray
Chummy Gray
Jim Gray
John Greason
Danny Green
Ed Green
Jim Green
John Greenig
Bill Greenwood
Ed Greer
Ed Gremminger
Mike Griffin
Sandy Griffin
Thomas Griffin
Clark Griffith
Frank Griffith
John Grim
John Grimes
Emil Gross
Henry Gruber
Ben Guiney
Ad Gumbert
Billy Gumbert
Fred Gunkle
Tom Gunning
Joe Gunson
Charlie Guth

H

Irv Hach
Mert Hackett
Walter Hackett
George Haddock
Frank Hafner
Art Hagan
Bill Hague
Noodles Hahn
Ed Haigh
Ed Halbriter
John Haldeman
Al Hall
Charlie Hall
George Hall
Jim Hall
Russ Hall
Jimmy Hallinan
Bill Hallman
Charlie Hallstrom
Jim Halpin
Ralph Ham
Charlie Hamburg
John Hamill
Billy Hamilton
Jim Handiboe
Frank Hankinson
Ned Hanlon
John Hanna
Frank Hansford
Bill Harbridge
Scott Hardesty
Lou Hardie
John Harkins
Dick Harley
George Harper
Jack Harper
Jerry Harrington
Joe Harrington
Charlie Harris
Frank Harris
Bill Hart
Billy Hart
Tom Hart
Jumbo Harting
Fred Hartman
Pat Hartnett
Topsy Hartsel
Zaza Harvey
Pete Hasney
Bill Hassamaer
Charlie Hastings
Scott Hastings
Gil Hatfield
John Hatfield
Charlie Hautz
Bill Hawes
Bill Hawke
Thorny Hawkes
Marvin Hawley
Pink Hawley
Jackie Hayes
John Hayes
James Haley
Fred Hayner
Tom Healey
Egyptian Healy
Charlie Heard
Guy Hecker
Emmet Heidrick
Frank Heifer
Jack Heinzman
Hellings
Tony Hellman
Horace Helmbold
George Hemming
Ducky Hemp
Charlie Hemphill
Hardie Henderson
Moxie Hengel
George Henry
John Henry
Art Herman
Tom Hernon
Joseph Herr
Lefty Herring
Tom Hess
George Heubel
Jake Hewitt
John Hibbard
Mike Hickey
Charlie Hickman
Ernie Hickman
Nat Hicks
Higby
Bill Higgins
Dick Higham
John Hiland
Belden Hill
Bill Hill
Charlie Hilsey
Hunkey Hines
Mike Hines
Paul Hines
Charlie Hodes
Charlie Hodnett
George Hodson
Bill Hoffer
Frank Hoffman
Jesse Hoffmeister
John Hofford
Bob Hogan
Marty Hogan
Mortimer Hogan
Sonny Hoffman
George Hogreiver
Bill Holbert
Jim Holdsworth
Will Holland
Bug Holliday
Holly Hollingshead
John Hollison
Ducky Holmes
Marty Honan
Mike Hooper
Buster Hoover
Charlie Hoover
Patrick Horan
Jack Horner
Joe Hornung
Elmer Horton
Pete Hotaling
Sadie Houck
Charlie Householder (1B)
Charlie Householder (UP)
John Houseman
William Houseman
Lefty Houtz
Shorty Howe
Harry Howell
Dummy Hoy
Al Hubbard
Nat Hudson
Frank Huelsman
Bill Hughes
Jay Hughes
Mickey Hughes
Tom Hughes
Jim Hughey
Billy Hulen
John Humphries
Dick Hunt
Bill Hunter
Lem Hunter
Dick Hurley
Jerry Hurley
Bill Husted
Bert Husting
Bill Hutchinson
Ed Hutchinson
William Hyndman

I

Charlie Ingraham
Bert Inks
Arthur Irwin
Charlie Irwin
Bill Irwin
John Irwin
Frank Isbell

J

Fred Jacklitsch
Henry Jackson
Sam Jackson
Harry Jacoby
Alamazoo Jennings
Hughie Jennings
Nat Jewett
Tommy Johns
Abe Johnson
William Johnson
Lefty Johnson
Lou Johnson
Spud Johnson
Youngy Johnson
Dick Johnston
Jones - LF
Jones - 3B
Alex Jones
Bill Jones
Bumpus Jones
Charley Jones
Charlie Jones
Cowboy Jones
Fielder Jones
Frank Jones
Henry Jones - P
Henry Jones - 2B
Jumping Jack Jones
Jim Jones
Levin Jones
Mike Jones
Charlie Jordan
Harry Jordan
Pop Joy
Bill Joyce
George Joyce

K

Mike Kahoe
Charlie Kalbfus
Jerry Kane
Heinie Kappel
Joe Kappel
Jack Katoll
Tom Kearns
Ed Keas
Bob Keating
George Keefe
John Keefe
Tim Keefe
Willie Keeler
Jack Keenan
Jim Keenan
Harry Keener
George Keerl
Bill Keister
George Kelb
Mike Kelley
Frank Keffer
Nate Kellogg
Bill Kelly
Charlie Kelly
John Kelly
Kick Kelly
King Kelly
John Kelty
Bill Kemmer
Rudy Kemmler
Brickyard Kennedy
Doc Kennedy
Ed Kennedy
John Kenney
Ed Kent
John Kerins
Joe Kernan
Henry Kessler
Fred Ketcham
Bill Kienzle
John Kiley
Henry Killeen
Frank Killen
Matt Kilroy
Gene Kimball
Sam Kimber
Sam King
Steve King
Marshall King
Silver King
Billy Kinloch
William Kinsler
Tom Kinslow
Walt Kinzie
John Kirby
Bill Kissinger
Frank Kitson
Malachi Kittridge
Bill Kling
Johnny Kling
Fred Klobedanz
Billy Klusman
Frank Knauss
Phil Knell
Charlie Knepper
George Knight
Joe Knight
Lon Knight
Ed Knouff
Jake Knowdell
Jimmy Knowles
Andy Knox
Henry Kohler
Eddie Kolb
Harry Koons
Jim Korwan
Joe Kostal
Frank Kreeger
Charlie Krehmeyer
Bill Krieg
Gus Krock
Otto Krueger
Al Krumm
Bill Kuehne
Charlie Kuhns

L

Candy LaChance
William Lackey
Steve Ladew
Hi Ladd
Flip Lafferty
Nap Lajoie
Dan Lally
Henry Lampe
Doc Landis
Chappy Lane
Bill Lange
Bob Langsford
Henry Larkin
Terry Larkin
Patrick Larkins
Sam LaRocque
Arlie Latham
Juice Latham
Tacks Latimer
Billy Lauder
Chuck Lauer
Ben Laughlin
Johnny Lavin
Mike Lawlor
Alfred Lawson
Tommy Leach
Dan Leahy
Tom Leahy
Jack Leary
Mike Ledwith
Leonidas Lee
Sam Leever
James Lehan
Mike Lehane
John Leighton
Jack Leiper
Bill Leith
Doc Leitner
Bill Lennon
David Lenz
Leonard
Andy Leonard
Tom Letcher
Charlie Levis
Lewis
Edward M. "Ted" Lewis
Fred Lewis
Steve Libby
Jim Lillie
Ezra Lincoln
Tom Lipp
Harry Little
Abel Lizotte
Harry Lochhead
Marshall Locke
Milo Lockwood
Tom Loftus
Pete Lohman
Herman Long
Jim Long
Thomas Long
Bill Loughran
Len Lovett
Tom Lovett
Bobby Lowe
Charlie Lowe
Dick Lowe
Con Lucid
Henry Luff
Al Lukens
Billy Lush
Luke Lutenberg
Henry Lynch
Jack Lynch
Denny Lyons
Harry Lyons
Toby Lyons
John Lyston
Dad Lytle

M

Mac MacArthur
Harry Mace
Macey
Connie Mack
Denny Mack
Reddy Mack
Jimmy Macullar
Kid Madden
Tony Madigan
Art Madison
Bill Magee
John Magner
George Magoon
Lou Mahaffey
Dan Mahoney
Mike Mahoney
Willard Mains
John Malarkey
Fergy Malone
John Maloney
Charlie Manlove
Fred Mann
Jack Manning
Jim Manning
Tim Manning
John Mansell
Mike Mansell
Tom Mansell
George Mappes
Lefty Marr
Ed Mars
Al Martin
Frank Martin
Phonney Martin
Harry Maskrey
Leech Maskrey
Charlie Mason
Ernie Mason
Bill Massey
Bobby Mathews
C. V. Matteson
Charles Matthews
Christy Mathewson
Steve Matthias
Mike Mattimore
Hal Mauck
Fred Mauer
Al Maul
Harry Maupin
Ed Mayer
Al Mays
Sport McAllister
Bub McAtee
McBride
Algie McBride
Dick McBride
Pete McBride
Harry McCaffery
Bill McCaffrey
Sparrow McCaffrey
Jack McCarthy
Tommy McCarthy
Frank McCarton
John McCarty
Al McCauley
Bill McCauley
Jim McCauley
Bill McClellan
McCloskey
Bill McCloskey
Hal McClure
Barry McCormick
Harry McCormick
Jerry McCormick
Jim McCormick
Jim McCormick
Art McCoy
Tom McCreery
Charlie McCullough
James McDermott
Michael McDermott
Mike McDermott
Sandy McDermott
Jack McDonald
Jim McDonald
McDoolan
Dewey McDougal
Sandy McDougal
Jim McElroy
Guy McFadden
Alex McFarlan
Dan McFarlan
Chris McFarland
Ed McFarland
Herm McFarland
Monte McFarland
Jack McFetridge
Ambrose McGann
Dan McGann
Chippy McGarr
Jack McGeachey
Mike McGeary
Pat McGee
Willie McGill
Jim McGinley
Tim McGinley
Frank McGinn
Gus McGinnis
Jumbo McGinnis
John McGlone
John McGraw
Mark McGrillis
Joe McGuckin
John McGuinness
McGuire
Deacon McGuire
Bill McGunnigle
Bob McHale
Frank McIntyre
Doc McJames
Frank McKee
Ed McKean
Jim McKeever
John McKelvey
Russ McKelvy
Ed McKenna
Frank McKenna
Kit McKenna
Patrick McKenna
Larry McKeon
Alex McKinnon
Barney McLaughlin
Frank McLaughlin
Jim McLaughlin
Tom McLaughlin
Warren McLaughlin
Jack McMahon
Sadie McMahon
Frank McManus
Pat McManus
George McMillan
John McMullin
Edgar McNabb
Frank McPartlin
Bid McPhee
Mart McQuaid
Mox McQuery
McRemer
Pete McShannic
Trick McSorley
Paul McSweeney
Jim McTamany
Cal McVey
George McVey
George Meakim
Pete Meegan
Dad Meek
Jouett Meekin
Frank Meinke
George Meister
John Meister
Jock Menefee
Win Mercer
Ed Merrill
Bill Merritt
Sam Mertes
Tom Messitt
Alfred Metcalfe
Levi Meyerle
George Meyers
Lou Meyers
Frank Millard
Bert Miller
Bob Miller
Cyclone Miller
Doggie Miller
Dusty Miller
Ed Miller
George Miller
Joe Miller (second baseman)
Joe Miller (shortstop)
Kohly Miller
Ralph Miller
Tom Miller
Jocko Milligan
Charlie Mills
Everett Mills
Ed Mincher
Dan Minnehan
Bobby Mitchell
Joe Moffet
Sam Moffet
Kid Mohler
Carlton Molesworth
Frank W. Monroe
George Moolic
Henry Moore
Jerry Moore
Molly Moore
Bill Moran
Sam Moran
Harry Morelock
Bill Morgan OF/C
Bill Morgan OF/SS
Pidgey Morgan
Gene Moriarty
John Morrill
Ed Morris
James Morris
Peter Morris
Hank Morrison
Jon Morrison
Mike Morrison
Tom Morrison
John Morrissey
Tom Morrissey
Charlie Morton
Frank Motz
Frank Mountain
Bill Mountjoy
Mike Moynahan
Mike Muldoon
John Mullen
Martin Mullen
Tony Mullane
John Mulligan
Henry Mullin
Joe Mulvey
George Mundinger
John Munce
Horatio Munn
Tim Murnane
Murphy
Bob Murphy
Clarence Murphy
Con Murphy
Connie Murphy
Danny Murphy - C
Danny Murphy - 2B
Ed Murphy
Joe Murphy
John Murphy
Larry Murphy
Morgan Murphy
Tony Murphy
Willie Murphy
Yale Murphy
Miah Murray
Tom Murray
Jim Mutrie
Al Myers
Bert Myers
Henry Myers

N

Tom Nagle
Kid Nance
Billy Nash
Sandy Nava
Jack Neagle
Joe Neale
Bill Nelson
Candy Nelson
Maud Nelson
Alexander Nevin
John Newell
T. E. Newell
Charlie Newman
Doc Newton
Sam Nicholl
Al Nichols
Art Nichols
Kid Nichols
Tricky Nichols
Parson Nicholson
George Nicol
Hugh Nicol
Tom Niland
Bill Niles
George Noftsker
The Only Nolan
Jerry Nops
Effie Norton
Frank Norton
Emory Nusz
Charlie Nyce

O

Henry Oberbeck
Doc Oberlander
Billy O'Brien
Cinders O'Brien
Darby O'Brien
Jack O'Brien (C)
Jack O'Brien (OF)
John O'Brien (2B)
John O'Brien (OF)
Tom H. O'Brien
Pete O'Brien
Tom J. O'Brien
John O'Connell
Pat O'Connell
Dan O'Connor
Frank O'Connor
Jack O'Connor
John O'Donnell
Dave Oldfield
Franklin W. Olin
Dan O'Leary
Patrick O'Loughlin
Tom O'Meara
Ed O'Neil
Fancy O'Neil
Hugh O'Neil
Dennis O'Neill
Fred O'Neill
John O'Neill
Tip O'Neill
O'Rourke
Jim O'Rourke
John O'Rourke
Mike O'Rourke
Tim O'Rourke
Tom O'Rourke
Tom Oran
Dave Orr
Al Orth
Fred Osborne
Charlie Osterhout
John Otten
Billy Otterson
Red Owens
Henry Oxley

P

Charlie Pabor
Ed Pabst
Dick Padden
Billy Palmer
John Pappalau
Freddy Parent
Doc Parker
Jay Parker
Bill Parks
Jiggs Parrott
Tom Parrott
Charlie Parsons
George Patterson
Tom Patterson
Lou Paul
Harley Payne
George Paynter
Elias Peak
Dickey Pearce
Frank Pearce
Frank Pears
George Pechiney
Heinie Peitz
Joe Peitz
Louis Pelouze
John Peltz
Jimmy Peoples
Harrison Peppers
John Peters
Pat Pettee
Bob Pettit
Charlie Petty
Bill Pfann
Fred Pfeffer
Dan Phelan
Dick Phelan
Nealy Phelps
Deacon Phillippe
Bill Phillips - 1B
Bill Phillips - P
Marr Phillips
Bill Phyle
Wiley Piatt
Ollie Pickering
Dave Pickett
John Pickett
Frank Pidgeon
Gracie Pierce
Maury Pierce
Andy Piercy
Dave Pierson
Dick Pierson
Israel Pike
Lip Pike
Ed Pinkham
George Pinkney
James Pirie
Togie Pittinger
Herman Pitz
Walter Plock
Mark Polhemus
Arlie Pond
Ed Poole
Tom Poorman
George Popplein
Henry Porter
Matthew Porter
Doc Potts
Abner Powell
Jack Powell
Jim Powell
Martin Powell
Tom Power
Doc Powers
Jim Powers
Phil Powers
Al Pratt
Tom Pratt
Walt Preston
Bill Price
Walter Prince
George Proeser
John Puhl
Blondie Purcell
Oscar Purner
Shadow Pyle

Q

Bill Quarles
Joe Quest
Quinlan
Frank Quinlan
Quinn
Frank Quinn
Joe Quinn 2B
Joe Quinn C
Paddy Quinn
Tom Quinn
Marshall Quinton

R

Charles Radbourn
George Radbourn
John Radcliff
Paul Radford
John Rainey
Toad Ramsey
Irv Ray
Harry Raymond
Al Reach
Bob Reach
Jeremiah Reardon
John Reccius
Phil Reccius
Billy Redmond
Icicle Reeder
Nick Reeder
Joe Regan
Billy Reid
Hugh Reid
Bill Reidy
Charlie Reilley
Charlie Reilly
Joe Reilly
John Reilly
Josh Reilly
Charlie Reipschlager
Laurie Reis
Charlie Reising
Heinie Reitz
Jack Remsen
George Rettger
Henry Reville
Charlie Reynolds (OF)
Charlie Reynolds (P)
William Rexter
Billy Rhines
Danny Richardson
Hardy Richardson
John Richmond
Lee Richmond
John Richter
Joe Rickert
Chris Rickley
John Ricks
John Riddle
Dorsey Riddlemoser
Billy Riley
Frank Ringo
Claude Ritchey
Charlie Ritter
Floyd Ritter
Whitey Ritterson
Jim Ritz
John Roach
Skel Roach
Fred Roat
Charlie Robinson
Fred Robinson
Jack Robinson
Val Robinson
Wilbert Robinson
Yank Robinson
Adam Rocap
Emmett Rogers
Fraley Rogers
Jim Rogers
Bill Rollinson
George Rooks
Rosie Rosebraugh
Chief Roseman
Bill Rotes
Bobby Rothermel
Jack Rothfuss
Phil Routcliffe
Dave Rowe
Jack Rowe
Ed Rowen
Jim Roxburgh
John Rudderham
John Russ
Paul Russell
Cyclone Ryan
Jack Ryan
Jimmy Ryan
John Ryan
Johnny Ryan
Mike Ryan
Tom Ryder

S

Harry Sage
Pony Sager
Ed Sales
Harry Salisbury
Ike Samuels
Ben Sanders
Edward Santry
Al Sauter
Will Sawyer
Jimmy Say
Lou Say
Mort Scanlan
Pat Scanlon
Harry Schafer
John Schappert
Nick Scharf
Ted Scheffler
Frank Scheibeck
Jack Scheible
Al Schellhase
Bill Schenck
Harry Scherer
Crazy Schmit
Jumbo Schoeneck
Otto Schomberg
Ossee Schreckengost
Pop Schriver
John Schultz - P
John Schulze (baseball) - C
Bill Schwartz
Scott
Ed Scott
Milt Scott
Doc Sechrist
Emmett Seery
Kip Selbach
Frank Sellman
Count Sensenderfer
Billy Serad
Ed Seward
George Seward
Socks Seybold
Cy Seymour
Jake Seymour
Tom Sexton
Orator Shafer
Taylor Shafer
Shaffer
Art Sladen
John Shaffer
Gus Shallix
Jim Shanley
Dan Shannon
Frank Shannon
George Sharrott
Jack Sharrott
Dupee Shaw
Sam Shaw
Dan Sheahan
Mike Shea
John Shearon
Jimmy Sheckard
Biff Sheehan
Tommy Sheehan
John Sheppard
Sheridan
John Shetzline
Lev Shreve
Billy Shindle
Tim Shinnick
George Shoch
John Shoupe
Frank Shugart
Fred Siefke
Fred Siegel
Frank Siffell
Ed Silch
Hank Simon
Joe Simmons
Marty Simpson
Ed Sixsmith
Al Skinner
Jimmy Slagle
John Slagle
Will Smalley
Bill Smiley
Smith
Aleck Smith
Bill Smith (OF/Manager)
Bill Smith (OF)
Billy Smith (P)
Charlie Smith
Ed Smith
Edgar Smith (OF)
Edgar Smith (OF/P)
Frank Smith
Fred Smith
Germany Smith
Harry Smith
Harvey Smith
Heinie Smith
John Smith (1B)
John Smith (SS)
Jud Smith
Leo Smith
Lewis Smith
Mike Smith
Ollie Smith
Phenomenal Smith
Pop Smith
Rex Smith
Skyrocket Smith
Stub Smith
Tom Smith - 2B
Tom Smith - P
John Sneed
Charlie Snow
Charles Snyder
Cooney Snyder
George Snyder
Jim Snyder
Josh Snyder
Pop Snyder
Redleg Snyder
Louis Sockalexis
Andy Sommerville
Ed Somerville
Joe Sommer
Andy Sommers
Bill Sowders
John Sowders
Len Sowders
Albert Spalding
Tully Sparks
Spencer
Harry Spies
Charlie Sprague
Ed Springer
Ed Spurney
Joe Stabell
Stafford
General Stafford
John Stafford
Chick Stahl
Harry Staley
George Stallings
Joe Stanley - OF (1880s)
Joe Stanley - OF (1900s)
Joe Start
Bill Stearns
Dan Stearns
John Stedronsky
Farmer Steelman
Gene Steere
Ed Stein
Henry Stein
Harry Steinfeldt
Bill Stellberger
Bill Stemmyer
Jake Stenzel
Ben Stephens
Clarence Stephens
Dummy Stephenson
Sterling
Ace Stewart
Archie Stimmel
Harry Stine
Gat Stires
Jack Stivetts
Len Stockwell
Stoddard
Harry Stovey
Tom Stouch
Sammy Strang
Asa Stratton
Ed Stratton
Scott Stratton
Joe Straub
Joe Strauss
Oscar Streit
Charles Strick
Cub Stricker
George Strief
John Strike
Al Strueve
Bill Stuart
Sy Studley
George Stultz
Neil Stynes
Tony Suck
Willie Sudhoff
Joe Sugden
Sullivan
Bill Sullivan - OF
Bill Sullivan - P
Billy Sullivan
Chub Sullivan
Dan Sullivan
Denny Sullivan
Fleury Sullivan
Joe Sullivan
Jim Sullivan
Marty Sullivan
Mike Sullivan - OF
Mike Sullivan - P
Pat Sullivan
Sleeper Sullivan
Suter Sullivan
Ted Sullivan
Tom Sullivan
Art Sunday
Billy Sunday
Sy Sutcliffe
Jack Sutthoff
Ezra Sutton
Cy Swaim
Andy Swan
Marty Swandell
Bill Swarback
Parke Swartzel
Ed Swartwood
Charlie Sweasy
Bill Sweeney
Charlie Sweeney
Dan Sweeney
Jerry Sweeney
Pete Sweeney
Rooney Sweeney
Sweigert
Pop Swett

T

John Taber
Jesse Tannehill
Billy Taylor - 3B
Billy Taylor - P
Dummy Taylor
Harry Taylor
Jack Taylor - P (1890s)
Jack Taylor - P (1900s)
Live Oak Taylor
Sandy Taylor
Zachary Taylor
George Tebeau
Patsy Tebeau
Pussy Tebeau
John K. Tener
Fred Tenney 1B
Fred Tenney OF
Tom Terrell
Adonis Terry
Walter Terry
Al Thake
Roy Thomas
Tom Thomas
Art Thompson
Frank Thompson
Sam Thompson
Tug Thompson
Will Thompson
John Thornton
Walter Thornton
Mike Tiernan
Bill Tierney
John Tilley
Jim Tipper
Ledell Titcomb
Bill Tobin
Frank Todd
Phil Tomney
Steve Toole
George Townsend
Jim Toy
Bill Traffley
John Traffley
Jim Tray
Fred Treacey
Pete Treacey
George Treadway
George Trenwith
Sam Trott
Dasher Troy
Fred Truax
Harry Truby
Ed Trumbull
Tommy Tucker
Jerry Turbidy
Tuck Turner
Art Twineham
Larry Twitchell
Jim Tyng

U

George Ulrich
Fred Underwood

V

Gene Vadeboncoeur
Bob Valentine
John Valentine
Bill Van Dyke
George Van Haltren
Dick Van Zant
Farmer Vaughn
Peek-A-Boo Veach
Lee Viau
Tom Vickery
Bill Vinton
Jake Virtue
Joe Visner
Tony Von Fricken
Alex Voss

W

Rube Waddell
Jack Wadsworth
Woody Wagenhorst
Butts Wagner
Honus Wagner
Charlie Waitt
Moses Fleetwood Walker
George Walker
Oscar Walker
Walt Walker
Welday Walker
Howard Wall
Bobby Wallace
Joe Walsh
Jim Ward
John Ward OF
John Ward P
John Montgomery Ward
Piggy Ward
Fred Warner
Jack Warner
Fred Waterman
Bill Watkins
Mother Watson
Farmer Weaver
Sam Weaver
Charlie Weber
Harry Weber
Joe Weber
Pete Weckbecker
Podge Weihe
Curt Welch
Mickey Welch
Tub Welch
Jake Wells
Jack Wentz
Perry Werden
Joe Werrick
Billy West
Buck West
Frank West
Huyler Westervelt
George Wetzel
Gus Weyhing
John Weyhing
George Wheeler
Harry Wheeler
Bobby Wheelock
Bill White
Deacon White
Elmer White
Warren White
Will White
William Edward White
Art Whitney
Lew Whistler
Pat Whitaker
Bill White (1B)
Bill White (SS)
Deacon White
Deke White
Elmer White
Warren White
Will White
Milt Whitehead
Guerdon Whiteley
Charles Witherow
Ed Whiting
Art Whitney
Frank Whitney
Jim Whitney
Bill Whitrock
Wild Bill Widner
Stump Wiedman
Joseph Wiley
Harry Wilhelm
Dale Williams
Gus Williams
Jimmy Williams
Pop Williams
Tom Williams
Ned Williamson
Julius Willigrod
Vic Willis
Wills
Dave Wills
Walt Wilmot
Bill Wilson
Henry Wilson
Highball Wilson
Parke Wilson
Tug Wilson
Zeke Wilson
George Winkelman
George Winkleman
Bill Wise
Nick Wise
Sam Wise
Joe Woerlin
Jimmy Wolf
Abe Wolstenholme
Rynie Wolters
Harry Wolverton
Wood, first name unknown
Bob Wood
Fred Wood
George Wood
Jimmy Wood
John Wood
Pete Wood
Fred Woodcock
Red Woodhead
Pete Woodruff
Walt Woods
Favel Wordsworth
Herb Worth
Jimmy Woulfe
Bill Wright
Dave Wright
George Wright
Harry Wright
Joe Wright
Pat Wright
Rasty Wright
Sam Wright
Zeke Wrigley
Ren Wylie
Willis Wyman
Bill Wynne

Y

Henry Yaik
George Yeager
Joe Yeager
Bill Yeatman
Bill Yerrick
Ed Yewell
Charlie Yingling
Joe Yingling
Tom York
Gus Yost
Cy Young
J. B. Young
Henry Youngman

Z

Fred Zahner
William Zay
Dave Zearfoss
George Zettlein
Charlie Ziegler
George Ziegler
Bill Zies
Chief Zimmer
Frank Zinn

 
19th century
Baseball
Baseball